Palmer is a given name of English origin that is a transferred use of a surname meaning palm bearer or pilgrim. Christian pilgrims to the Holy Land traditionally carried the palms.

The name can also be given in reference to the palms that are traditionally carried by Christians on the Sunday before Easter Sunday. The palms from the previous year are burned and the ashes used to smudge the foreheads of worshippers attending Ash Wednesday services during Holy Week in some Christian churches as a physical reminder of their mortality.

Popularity
It has been among the one thousand most popular given names for girls in the United States since 2018 and among the 350 most popular names for American girls since 2020. It is one of a number of surname names or previously masculine names that have become fashionable for American girls. The name was among the 1,000 most popular names for American boys between 1881 and 1949 but then declined in popularity as a masculine name. It was again one of the 1,000 most common names for American boys in 2021, when it was  used for 161 boys and ranked 990th on the popularity chart, compared with 883 uses for American girls in 2021, the year it ranked in 329th position on the list of most used names for newborn American girls.

People with the given name

Palmer Burch (1907–1990), American politician
Palmer W. Collins (1930–2018), American politician
Palmer Cox (1840–1924), Canadian illustrator and author
Palmer F. Daugs (1903–1980), American politician
Palmer DePaulis (born 1945), American politician
Palmer D. Farrington (1918–1996), American politician
Palmer Griffiths (1880–1973), Welsh rugby union footballer
H. Palmer Hall (1942-2013), American poet, fiction writer, essayist, editor and librarian
Palmer E. Havens (1818–1886), American politician
Palmer Hayden (1890–1973), American painter
Palmer Kelley, American baseball player
Palmer Luckey (born 1992), American entrepreneur
Palmer McAbee (1894–1970), American musician
Palmer E. Pierce (1865–1940), American general and sports administrator
Palmer Cosslett Putnam (1900–1984), American engineer
Palmer Pyle (1937–2021), American football player
Palmer C. Ricketts (1856–1934), American academic administrator
Palmer Taylor (born 1992), Canadian snowboarder
Palmer Wapau (born 1983), Australian rugby league footballer
Palmer Williams (?–1996), American journalist
Palmer Williams Jr. (born 1965), American actor

Fictional characters
Palmer Cortlandt, a character on the soap opera All My Children

Notes

English masculine given names
English feminine given names